The WPGA International Challenge was a women's professional golf tournament on the LET Access Series, held between 2013 and 2019 in Suffolk, England.

The event succeed the Challenge Tour's English Challenge, held at Stoke by Nayland Hotel, Golf & Spa in Stoke-by-Nayland 2010–2012. The 54-hole tournament, which was the only event on the LETAS schedule to be played in the United Kingdom during its run, featured an international field of 120 players.

Alice Hewson made her first appearance as a professional at the 2019 event, but lost by one stroke to Manon De Roey, who became the only player to defend her title after Lydia Hall narrowly lost out in 2018.

Winners

See also
English Challenge

References

External links

LET Access Series events
Golf tournaments in England